A National Treasure or a national precious object  is a tangible cultural heritage or object handed down from the past with historical, cultural or scientific value of exceptional significance to the country of Vietnam. National treasures are deemed to be protected and preserved according to a special scheme by the Vietnamese Government. The government also earmark an adequate proportion of the State budget to purchase national treasure as well as investment in activities of protecting and promoting the values of these objects. The title national treasure is recognised by a decision from the Vietnamese Prime Minister after obtaining evaluation opinions of the National Council for Cultural Heritages.

History 

The term national treasure was first mentioned in various articles of the first Law on Cultural Heritage passed by the National Assembly of Vietnam on 29 June 2001. However, there was not a clear definition or a set of criteria for determining a national treasure. In 2009, the Amendment of Law on Cultural Heritage Act presented a separate article specifically for the subject "national treasure". According to the Law, a national treasure of Vietnam have to meet all these requirements:

The Minister of Culture, Sports and Tourism specified the order of and procedures for recognising a national treasure, then the decision of granting the title national treasure comes from the Prime Minister of Vietnam with the consultation of National Council for Cultural Heritages. The first set of national treasure is officially designated in October 2012. Up until 2023, 11 sets of national treasures (265 artifacts) had been designated in a series of decrees signed by the Deputy Prime Minister of Vietnam on behalf of Prime Minister. The different combination of treasures into sets only depends on the chronological order of nominations submitted by owners of the treasures, not related to the category or value of the treasures themselves. The quantities and designation dates of Vietnamese national treasures are:

Set 1 (signed on 1 October 2012) 30 national treasures
Set 2 (signed on 30 December 2013) 37 national treasures
Set 3 (signed on 14 January 2015) 12 national treasures
Set 4 (signed on 23 December 2015) 25 national treasures
Set 5 (signed on 22 December 2016) 14 national treasures

Set 6 (signed on 25 December 2017) 24 national treasures
Set 7 (signed on 24 December 2018) 22 national treasures
Set 8 (signed on 15 January 2020) 27 national treasures
Set 9 (signed on 31 December 2020) 24 national treasures
Set 10 (signed on 25 December 2021) 23 national treasures
Set 11 (signed on 30 January 2023) 27 national treasures

Regulations 

There are strict regulations related to obligation of the Vietnamese State and owners of national treasure regarding ownership, protection and exhibition abroad. National treasures shall be registered with competent state agencies in charge of culture. Government agencies which have information on registered national treasures must kept confidential at owner's request, provide with professional guidance on, and create conditions for protecting and promoting the values of treasures. When transferring the ownership of national treasures, their owners shall notify competent government agencies of new owners of these objects within 15 days after the transfer.

In 2016, under Decision No. 23/2016/QD-TTg, issued by the Prime Minister of Vietnam, items formally designated as national treasures can only be transported abroad under one of these circumstances:
"To serve state-level diplomatic activities of the Party General Secretary, the President, the Prime Minister and the National Assembly Chairperson.
"To promote the history, culture, land and people of Vietnam under special international cooperation programs.
"To implement international cooperation plans on research and preservation of national treasures."

Transport of the treasures abroad for display, exhibition, research or preservation must adhere to article 44 of the Law on Cultural Heritage, which requires the following conditions:
"Getting insured by recipients of vestiges, antiques and national precious object
"Obtaining the Prime Minister's decisions permitting the bringing of national treasure abroad; or the Culture Minister's decisions permitting the bringing of vestiges and antiques abroad."

List

Set 1 
The first set of 30 national treasure was designated on 1 October 2012 by Decision No. 1426/QD-TTg signed by Deputy Prime Minister Nguyen Thien Nhan.

Set 2 
The second set of 37 national treasures was designated on 30 December 2013 by Decision No. 2599/QD-TTg signed by Deputy Prime Minister Vũ Đức Đam.

Set 3 
The third set of 12 national treasure was designated on 14 January 2015 by Decision No. 53/QD-TTg signed by Deputy Prime Minister Vu Duc Dam.

Set 4 
The fourth set of 25 national treasure was designated on 23 December 2015 by Decision No. 2382/QD-TTg signed by Deputy Prime Minister Vu Duc Dam.

Set 5 
The fifth set of 14 national treasure was designated on 22 December 2016 by Decision No. 2496/QD-TTg signed by Deputy Prime Minister Vu Duc Dam.

Set 6 
The sixth set of 24 national treasures was designated on 25 December 2017 by Decision No. 2089/QD-TTg signed by Deputy Prime Minister Vu Duc Dam.

Set 7 
The seventh set of 22 national treasures was designated on 24 December 2018 by Decision No. 1821/QD-TTg signed by Deputy Prime Minister Vu Duc Dam.

Set 8 
The eighth set of 27 national treasures was designated on 15 January 2020 by Decision No. 88/QD-TTg signed by Deputy Prime Minister Vu Duc Dam.

Set 9
The ninth set of 24 national treasures was designated on 31 December 2020 by Decision No. 2283/QD-TTg signed by Deputy Prime Minister Vu Duc Dam.

Set 10
The tenth set of 23 national treasures was designated on 25 December 2021 by Decision No. 2198/QĐ-TTg signed by Deputy Prime Minister Vu Duc Dam.

Set 11
The eleventh set of 27 national treasures was designated on 30 January 2023 by Decision No. 41/QĐ-TTg signed by Deputy Prime Minister Trần Hồng Hà.

See also 
 National Treasure
 List of Chinese cultural relics forbidden to be exhibited abroad
 National Treasures of Japan
 National Treasures of North Korea
 National Treasures of South Korea
 National Treasures of Taiwan

References 

National Treasures of Vietnam